Franz Rolf Schröder (8 September 1893 – 24 March 1979), often referred to as F. R. Schröder, was a German philologist who was Professor and Chair of German Philology at the University of Würzburg. He specialized in the study German and early Germanic literature, and Germanic and Indo-European religion.

Biography
Franz Rolf Schröder was born in Kiel, Germany on 8 September 1893. He was the son of Johannes Franz Heinrich Schröder and Minna Amanda Rolfs.

Schröder graduated from high school in 1911, and subsequently studied German philology at the University of Kiel. He served as a volunteer in the German Army during the early months of World War I, and gained a PhD at Kiel in 1916 under the supervision of Hugo Gering. His thesis was on the Hálfdanar saga Eysteinssonar. He completed his habilitation in German and Nordic philology at Heidelberg University in 1920 with a thesis on the Nibelungen. Schröder subsequently lectured at Heidelberg.  

In 1925, Schröder was made Professor and Chair of German Philology at the University of Würzburg. He would eventually also succeed his father as editor of the Germanisch-Romanische Monatsschrift. Schröder specialized in the study of Germanic religion from a comparative perspective, and was particularly interested in its relationship with Indo-European religion.  

Schröder retired in 1959, and was made a Corresponding Member of the Austrian Academy of Sciences in 1965. He died in Würzburg on 24 March 1979.

Selected works
 Germanentum und Hellenismus. Untersuchungen zur germanischen Religionsgeschichte, 1924
 Die Parzivalfrage, 1928
 Altgermanische Kulturprobleme, 1929
 Die Germanen – Religionsgeschichtliches Lesebuch, 1929
 Quellenbuch zur germanischen Religionsgeschichte, 1933
 Germanische Heldendichtung, 1935
 Untersuchungen zur germanischen und vergleichenden Religionsgeschichte, 1941

See also

 Jan de Vries (philologist)
 Hermann Güntert
 Edgar C. Polomé
 Otto Höfler
 Gabriel Turville-Petre
 Rudolf Much
 Wolfgang Krause

References

Sources

Further reading

 Deutsche Biographische Enzyklopädie, München u. a. 1996. 
 Jan de Vries: Forschungsgeschichte der Mythologie. Orbis Verlag, Freiburg/München 1961.
 Rudolf Simek: Lexikon der germanischen Mythologie. Kröner, Stuttgart 2006, .
 Ernst Klee: „Franz Rolf Schröder“ Eintrag in ders.: Das Kulturlexikon zum Dritten Reich. Wer war was vor und nach 1945. S. Fischer, Frankfurt am Main 2007, 

1893 births
1979 deaths
Corresponding Members of the Austrian Academy of Sciences
Germanic studies scholars
Germanists
German Army personnel of World War I
Heidelberg University alumni
Academic staff of Heidelberg University
Indo-Europeanists
Linguists of Germanic languages
Linguists of Indo-European languages
Old Norse studies scholars
Writers from Kiel
University of Kiel alumni
Academic staff of the University of Würzburg
Writers on Germanic paganism